Kalkūni may refer to:

Kalkūni, Augšdaugava Municipality, a village in Kalkūne Parish, Augšdaugava Municipality, Latvia
Kalkūne Parish
Kalkūni, Daugavpils, a neighbourhood of Daugavpils, Latvia
 Kalkuni,  Karnataka, India